Nicole Croisille (born 9 October 1936 in Neuilly-sur-Seine, France) is a French singer and actress. She has appeared in 24 films between 1961 and 2005, and recorded several albums since 1961.

Perhaps her most heard work is on the soundtrack of 1966 film, A Man and a Woman (Un Homme et Une Femme). She sang one solo, "Today It's You," and dueted with Pierre Barouh on several other numbers.

Croisille attempted to represent France in the Eurovision Song Contest 1974 with the songs "Tu m'avais dit" and "Je t'aime un point c'est tout", but Dani was selected instead, although she did not participate due to Georges Pompidou's death being on the week in the contest. Her best-known records are "I'll Never Leave You"; "Telephone-Moi"; "Une Femme avec Toi"; "J'ai besoin de Toi, J'ai besoin de Lui"; and "Parlez-moi de Lui".

Her single, "Woman in Your Arms", peaked at number 71 in Australia in May 1976.

She lives with Ménière's disease.

References

External links

1936 births
Living people
People from Neuilly-sur-Seine
French film actresses
French women singers
20th-century French actresses
21st-century French actresses
People with Ménière's Disease